Thomas Kraus (born 5 April 1987) is a German footballer who plays as a forward for 1. FC Köln II.

External links

1987 births
Living people
German footballers
Hertha BSC II players
1. FC Köln II players
SV Eintracht Trier 05 players
SC Fortuna Köln players
3. Liga players
Regionalliga players
Association football midfielders
Association football forwards
Borussia Mönchengladbach II players
Sportspeople from Bamberg
Footballers from Bavaria